Ghana competed at the 2018 Winter Olympics in Pyeongchang, South Korea, from 9 to 25 February 2018. Netherlands-based Akwasi Frimpong was the country's sole athlete, competing in the skeleton event.

Background
Jerry Shaib Ahmed was the chef de mission of the Ghanaian delegate to the 2018 Winter Olympics. Netherlands-based Akwasi Frimpong was the sole athlete who qualified for the skeleton event of the Games by virtue of ranking within the top 60 of International Bobsleigh and Skeleton Federation's mid-January 2018 rankings.

He became the second Ghanaian to participate in the Winter Olympics after alpine skier Kwame Nkrumah-Acheampong participated in the 2010 edition in Vancouver. Frimpong was the first Olympian from West Africa to participate in the skeleton event as well as the first black Olympian to represent an African country in the sport.

While the Ghana Olympic Committee (GOC) secured a monthly $1,500 allowance for Frimpong, Ghanaian chef de mission Ahmed looked for corporate sponsors to fund an additional $57,000 needed for Ghana's participation in the Games and reasoned that the Ghanaian government was already burdened due to time constraints. Local firm, "Cocoa from Ghana" donated $25,000 to the GOC.

Competitors
The following is the list of number of competitors participating at the Games per sport/discipline.

Skeleton 

Ghana qualified one male skeleton athlete. This marked the country's Winter Olympics debut in the sport.

See also
Ghana at the 2018 Summer Youth Olympics
Ghana at the 2018 Commonwealth Games

References

Nations at the 2018 Winter Olympics
2018
Winter Olympics